The Dynamic Billard Treviso Open 2018 (sometimes known as the 2018 Italy Open) was the sixth and final Euro Tour 9-Ball pool event in 2018. The event was won by Russia's Fedor Gorst who defeated Poland's Mateusz Śniegocki 9–7 in the final. This was Gorst's first Euro Tour victory.

Wiktor Zieliński was the defending champion, after having won the 2017 Treviso Open, but lost matches to  Andreas Madsen and Tobias Bongers in the double elimination round.

Tournament format
The event saw a total of 193 players compete, in a double-elimination knockout tournament, until the last 32 stage; where the tournament was contested as single elimination.

Prize fund 
The tournament prize fund was similar to that of other Euro Tour events, with €4,500 for the winner of the event.

References

External links

Euro Tour
2018 Euro Tour events
Sporting events in Italy
November 2018 sports events in Italy
Treviso Open
International sports competitions hosted by Italy
Sports competitions in Treviso